The 6th Frigate Squadron was an administrative unit of the Royal Navy from 1950 to 2002.

History

During its existence, the squadron included , Type 15,  and Type 23 frigates.

Ships from the squadron participated in the Coronation Fleet Review, the Beira Patrol, the Cod Wars, the Silver Jubilee Fleet Review, the Falklands War and STANAVFORLANT.

Ships assigned to the squadron bore a badge on their funnels or superstructure depicting the Red Hand of Ulster.

The squadron was active in Singapore from December 1960 to September 1961; September 1962 to January 1963, before being redesignated to the 25th Escort Squadron. 

At the Silver Jubilee Fleet Review, 24–29 June 1977, the squadron comprised:
  – Capt K. A. Low, RN (Captain Sixth Frigate Squadron)
  – Capt R. C. Dimmock, RN
  – Cdr P. Bell, RN
  – Cdr P. J. King, RN

The squadron was disbanded in 2002 for the last time following the Royal Navy's "Fleet First" reorganisation.

Squadron commander

References

See also
 List of squadrons and flotillas of the Royal Navy

Frigate squadrons of the Royal Navy